Japan has favorable sites for geothermal power because of its proximity to the Izu–Bonin–Mariana Arc. In 2007, Japan had 535.2 MW of installed electric generating capacity, about 5% of the world total. Geothermal power plays a minor role in the energy sector in the country: in 2013 it supplied 2596 GWh of electricity, representing about 0.25% of the country's total electricity supply.

Development of new geothermal power stations essentially stopped since the mid 1990s, mainly due to the strong resistance from local communities. Most of the potential sites are located in government-protected areas and in tourist destinations, thanks to the presence of traditional hot springs or onsen. 
Local communities in these areas are often dependent on revenue from tourists visiting onsen, and are opposed to geothermal developments because of the negative impact that the industry may have on the scenery and the resulting damage to the tourism industry and the local economy.

However, interest in geothermal energy has been increasing in recent years due to the Japanese energy crisis following the Fukushima disaster and the subsequent closure of most of the country's nuclear power stations. Businesses and the government are currently considering over 60 possible sites for new geothermal power development. Estimates put the total capacity potential of geothermal power at 23 GW, the third largest amount in the world after the United States and Indonesia. 
An estimation suggests that about 1,500 hot water wells and springs could generate as much as 723 MWe without additional drillings.

Power stations

As of 2003, 20 geothermal power plants are in operation at 18 locations in Japan.

Technology

Japan has developed advanced technologies for the exploration, development, utilization and monitoring of geothermal resources. Due to the stagnant domestic geothermal sector, most of the technologies have been used in overseas development in recent years. Japan provided about 67% of all the turbines used in geothermal power stations in the world in the last 10 years.

History
The country's first experimental geothermal power station was opened in 1925 in Beppu, Ōita Prefecture. However, research in geothermal energy was slowed down by the Second World War. The first full scale geothermal power generation plant was Matsukawa in Iwate Prefecture, owned by Nihon Heavy Chemical Industory Corp. The plant started operating in 1966 with a capacity of 9.5 MW.
In 1967, Otake Geothermal Power station in Ōita Prefecture, owned by Kyushu Electric Power, launched with 11 MW. After these first generation facilities, which were considered large scale experimental plants, from the mid-1970s new generation more efficient geothermal plants were opened. Until the mid-1980s, these were typically mid-sized plants with capacities of around 50 MW. Starting from the late 1980s more advanced technologies allowed for the economical exploration and development of even smaller geothermal resources, allowing the launch of several smaller scale plants.
Total generation reached 500 MW in 1996.

In April 2011, Japanese Ministry of the Environment issued a "Study of Potential for the introduction of Renewable Energy" report. It has shown total 19.14GW of Japanese geothermal resource potential.

See also
List of geothermal power stations
Energy in Japan
Electricity sector in Japan
Hydroelectricity in Japan
Solar power in Japan
Wind power in Japan
Renewable energy by country

References

External links 
Electrical Japan: Google Maps of Power Stations (Geothermal)